The Shrine of St. Joseph is a Catholic church in St. Louis, Missouri in Columbus Square. The church began in 1843 when the Jesuits founded the parish to serve the residential community consisting mostly of German immigrants. The church is the site of the only authenticated miracle in the Midwestern United States.

History

1846–1866

After founding the parish in 1843, the Jesuits immediately instituted to build a church. Mrs. Ann Biddle a wealthy widow, known for her many philanthropic deeds, donated the land for the new church. The cornerstone for the new church was blessed by Bishop Kenrick on April 14, 1844. The completed building was a modest building which faced west toward 11th Street and was dedicated on the first Sunday in August, 1846 with Father James Van de Velde, later Bishop of Chicago, officiating.

Soon St. Joseph parish was a very active community. In 1862 a large parish school was built nearby, to care for the many children of the area. The School Sisters of Notre Dame staffed the school.

1866–1880

Just at this time a Jesuit missionary, Father Francis Xavier Weninger, came to St. Joseph's to preach.

Over the years the parish grew, it became obvious that the original church was no longer large enough to serve the congregation. It was decided to build a large addition to the old building and to revise the structure so that the entrance faced Biddle Street. Bishop Kenrick laid the cornerstone for this second St. Joseph in 1865.

Bueschers of Chicago, famous for their religious art work, were employed to carve an elaborate altar, which is designed as a replica of the Altar of St. Ignatius in the Jesuit Gesu Church in Rome, except that the figure of St. Joseph and the Christ Child are substituted for the figure of St. Ignatius. Beneath the central figures appear the words: "Ite ad Joseph", Go to Joseph.

Known as "The Altar of Answered Prayers" because of its origin, this beautiful work can still be seen at St. Joseph's Shrine, where it serves as the central altar. It was installed early in 1867, at a total cost of $6,131. The grateful parishioners raised the additional funds above their original pledge in recognition of their deliverance from the cholera epidemic.

The primary remodeling was completed in 1866. Father Pierre Jean De Smet, noted missionary to the Indians, officiated at the dedication services on December 30, 1866.

1880–1954

In 1880 the church was once again enlarged and remodeled. This work, which included the addition of an elaborate Romanesque face and twin towers surmounted with delicate cupolas, was completed in 1881.

Further alterations had to be made in 1954, under the supervision of the shrine's pastor, Father Anthony Corey. At this time, for reasons of safety, the beautiful original towers were shortened, and the cupolas replaced by heavier, hexagonal caps, thus considerably altering the exterior of the building, and detracting from its former beauty. This was after the Jesuits left the parish and was staffed by priest of the Archdiocese.

While owned by the Archdiocese of St. Louis the now Shrine of St. Joseph is leased to The Friends of The Shrine of St. Joseph, Inc. a not for profit 501(c)(3) corporation. All donations are tax deductible to the extent allowable by law.

Restoration

The church continued to flourish until after World War II. As the neighborhood began to decline, and parishioners were moving to the newer suburbs, attendance at Mass fell greatly.  The church fell into a state of disrepair. The roof leaked, birds had occupied the belfries where droppings were feet deep. Water stained the paintings and the underlying plaster became cracked. For reasons not understood, many of the beautiful objects had been covered in gray paint, including the Stations of the Cross and the ornate carved pulpit.

Because of the dwindling parish and the extensive damage to the building, the Archdiocese had planned to tear it down.
In 1979, the elderly pastor, Father Edward Filipiak, refused to retire saying, “If I leave, they will close it. I would die for this church.”  Three teenagers broke into the rectory to steal wine  and murdered Filipiak. A small group of men were then determined to try to save the church. Slowly they raised money from donations. At the cost of hundreds of thousands of dollars and many man-hours, the church was fully restored. It is considered one of the most beautiful churches in St. Louis.

It is not a parish in the ordinary sense. While the building remains the property of the St. Louis Archdiocese, the operation and maintenance of the church are by The Friends of the Shrine of St. Joseph, a 501.c.3 non-profit organization. Masses are celebrated each Sunday and on First Fridays of each month.

Devotions

Novena to St. Joseph 
After the 11 a.m. Mass nine weeks before the feast of St. Joseph.(March 19)

The Rosary is recited before 11:00 a.m. Sunday Mass.

After Sunday Mass, a relic of St. Peter Claver, a bone chip, is displayed for veneration. It is in a reliquary in the form of a cross.

Gallery

See also
 List of Jesuit sites

References

External links

 Shrine of St. Joseph Official Website
 Church of Miracles official documentary video (2000) alternate1, alternate2, from the Shrine of St. Joseph's Friends
 Photos of the Shrine of Saint Joseph
 

Roman Catholic churches in St. Louis
German-American culture in St. Louis
Jesuit churches in the United States
Churches on the National Register of Historic Places in Missouri
Landmarks of St. Louis
1843 establishments in Missouri
National Register of Historic Places in St. Louis
Roman Catholic shrines in the United States
Buildings and structures in St. Louis
Tourist attractions in St. Louis
Roman Catholic churches completed in 1844
19th-century Roman Catholic church buildings in the United States